OGHS is an acronym for:
 One Great Hour of Sharing, an annual offering taken to fund the United Methodist Committee on Relief
 Orange Glen High School in Escondido, California, United States
 Otago Girls' High School in Dunedin, Otago, New Zealand
 Ottawa-Glandorf High School in Ottawa, Ohio, United States